The Centre for Philosophy of Natural and Social Science (CPNSS) is an interdisciplinary research centre at the London School of Economics and Political Science. The CPNSS was established in 1990 and aims to promote research into philosophical, methodological and foundational questions arising in the natural and the social sciences, as well as their application to practical problems.

The CPNSS supports interdisciplinary and inter-institutional research and maintains international collaborations and partnerships. It is home to a number of research projects that bring together academics from different backgrounds, and it hosts researchers pursuing individual research initiatives. The CPNSS also hosts a visitors' programme through which researchers are able to visit the Centre for a term or an academic year to participate in existing projects and pursue their own research.

Its current director is Professor Roman Frigg.

Other academics and researchers associated with the CPNSS are:
 Rom Harré (Former Director)
 Nancy Cartwright (Former Director)
 Helena Cronin (Co-Director)
 Michael Redhead (Co-Director)
 John Worrall
 Nicholas Humphrey
 John Dupré
 Meghnad Desai

External links 
CPNSS homepage
CPNSS Discussion papers

London School of Economics
Multidisciplinary research institutes
Research institutes in London
Economic research institutes
Philosophy institutes
Social science institutes
Research institutes established in 1990
1990 establishments in the United Kingdom